Dietmar ("Didi") Kühbauer (born 4 April 1971) is an Austrian professional football coach and a former midfielder. He is the head coach of LASK.

Career
Born in Heiligenkreuz, Burgenland, Kühbauer started his professional career at Admira Wacker, making his Austrian Football Bundesliga debut in 1987, at 16 years of age. After five years he moved to city rivals Rapid Wien with whom he won a league and domestic cup title. He also played in the 1996 UEFA Cup Winners Cup Final against Paris St Germain in Brussels, which Rapid lost. "Don Didi" is still considered a star among the Rapid fans. In 1999, he was chosen in Rapid's Team of the Century.

In 1997, after becoming the first international to advertise his availability on the Internet, he moved abroad to join La Liga side Real Sociedad. In 2000 he signed for German Bundesliga outfit VfL Wolfsburg. Two years later, he returned to Austria to play for his childhood team SV Mattersburg where he finished his playing career after the 2007–08 season.

International career
He made his debut for Austria in a May 1992 friendly match against Poland and was a participant at the 1998 FIFA World Cup. He earned 55 caps, scoring five goals. On 4 September 2005, he announced his retirement from international matches. His final international was a September 2005 World Cup qualification match against Poland.

Coaching career
On 18 November 2008, he signed a contract by Trenkwalder Admira II as head coach. In 2010, he became coach of the first squad and led the team to the promotion to the Austrian Football Bundesliga. From September 2013 to November 2015 he was the trainer of Wolfsberger AC.

On 1 October 2018, Kühbauer was announced to become the new head coach of SK Rapid Wien, after only a half year at SKN St. Pölten.

Personal tragedy
On 16 February 1997, Kühbauer's pregnant wife Michaela drove to Vienna International Airport to pick him up after Rapid had enjoyed a winter break in Dubai. Tragedy happened when her car slewed off the road near Eisenstadt and she was rushed to hospital, with three ribs having punctured her lung. She fell into a coma and died on 13 September 1997. A disillusioned Kühbauer then left Austria to start a new career abroad.

Managerial statistics

Honours

Player
Rapid Wien
 Austrian Football Bundesliga: 1995–96
 Austrian Cup: 1994–95

Coach
FC Admira Mödling
 Austrian Football First League: 2010–11

References

External links
 Dietmar Kühbauer at Rapid Archiv 
 

1971 births
Living people
People from Jennersdorf District
Association football midfielders
Austrian footballers
Austria international footballers
1998 FIFA World Cup players
FC Admira Wacker Mödling players
SK Rapid Wien players
Real Sociedad footballers
VfL Wolfsburg players
SV Mattersburg players
Austrian Football Bundesliga players
La Liga players
Bundesliga players
Expatriate footballers in Spain
Expatriate footballers in Germany
Austrian football managers
FC Admira Wacker Mödling managers
Footballers from Burgenland
Austrian expatriate sportspeople in Spain
Wolfsberger AC managers
SK Rapid Wien managers
SKN St. Pölten managers
LASK managers
Austrian expatriate sportspeople in Germany